Bukowiec  is a settlement in the administrative district of Gmina Subkowy, within Tczew County, Pomeranian Voivodeship, in northern Poland.

The settlement has a population of 1.

References

Bukowiec